Ceratocampinae is a subfamily of the family Saturniidae.

This subfamily contains the following genera:

Adeloneivaia Travassos, 1940
Adelowalkeria Travassos, 1941
Almeidella Oiticica, 1946
Anisota Hübner, 1820
Bathyphlebia Felder, 1874
Ceratesa Michener, 1949
Ceropoda Michener, 1949
Cicia Oiticica, 1964
Citheronia Hübner, 1819
Citheronioides Lemaire, 1988
Citheronula Michener, 1949
Citioica Travassos & Noronha, 1965
Dacunju Travassos & Noronha, 1965
Dryocampa Harris, 1833
Eacles Hübner, 1819
Giacomellia Bouvier, 1930
Jaiba Lemaire, Tangerini & Mielke, 1999
Megaceresa Michener, 1949
Mielkesia Lemaire, 1988
Neorcarnegia Draudt, 1930
Oiticella Michener, 1949
Othorene Boisduval, 1872
Procitheronia Michener, 1949
Psigida Oiticica, 1959
Psilopygida Michener, 1949
Psilopygoides Michener, 1949
Ptiloscola Michener, 1949
Rachesa Michener, 1949
Schausiella Bouvier, 1930
Scolesa Michener, 1949
Syssphinx Hübner, 1819

References

 
Saturniidae